Capital High School is a three-year public secondary school in  Boise, Idaho, United States. Opened in the fall of 1965, it was the third of four public high schools constructed in the Boise School District, and serves its northern portion. The other high schools are Boise (1902) in the east, Borah (1958) in the southwest, and Timberline (1998) in the southeast.

The Capital High boundary includes sections of Eagle and Garden City.

Athletics
Capital competes in athletics in IHSAA Class 5A in the Southern Idaho Conference (5A) (SIC). The longtime rivals are Boise and Borah. The tennis team has won 16 state titles, including five consecutive from 1972 to 1976. The boys basketball team won four consecutive A-1 (now 5A) state titles from 1975 to 1978.

State titles
Boys
 Football (2): fall 1983, 1991  (official with introduction of playoffs, fall 1979)
 (unofficial poll titles - 2) - fall 1974, 1977 (poll introduced in 1963, through 1978)
 Cross Country (2): fall 1965, 1977, 2004, 2013 
 Basketball (6): 1968, 1975, 1976, 1977, 1978, 2014 
 Baseball (3): 1989, 2009, 2014  (records not kept by IHSAA)
 Track (5): 1974, 1979, 1980, 1985, 2009, 2015 
 Golf (1): 1974 
 Tennis - (combined until 2008, see below)

Girls
 Cross Country (1): fall 1980 
 Basketball (1): 1977 
 Track (3): 1981, 1984, 1988 

Combined
 Tennis (16): 1968, 1972, 1973, 1974, 1975, 1976, 1978, 1981, 1985, 1988, 1989, 1992, 1993, 2002, 2006, 2007 (combined until 2008)

Notable alumni
 Matthew Barney (1985), artist
 Geraldo Boldewijn, American football player
 Ben Driebergen, former U.S. Marine, winner of Survivor: Heroes v. Healers v. Hustlers
 Hailey Duke, alpine ski racer
 Rep. Annette (Williams) Glenn, Michigan House of Representatives. Source: http://www.RepGlenn.com
 John Grant (1968), NFL defensive lineman
 Bryan Harsin (1994), college football head coach
 Ernie Hughes, NFL player
 Marques McFadden (1995), former NFL offensive guard 
 Jake Plummer (1993), former NFL quarterback 
 Tobias Read (1993), politician (Oregon House of Representatives)
 Bill Sali (1972), former congressman
 Gary Stevens (1981), thoroughbred horse racing jockey
 Curtis Stigers (1983), musician
 Gary Wimmer, American football player

References

External links
 
 MaxPreps.com – Capital Eagles
 Boise School District

Educational institutions established in 1965
Treasure Valley
High schools in Boise, Idaho
Public high schools in Idaho
1965 establishments in Idaho